Moscow is an unincorporated community on the Ohio River along West Virginia Route 2 in Hancock County, West Virginia, United States.

An early variant name was New Lexington.

See also
List of cities and towns along the Ohio River

References 

Unincorporated communities in Hancock County, West Virginia
Unincorporated communities in West Virginia